Integra Signum was a publicly traded Swiss company active in train control and signaling systems. Its main achievement was the development of the train control system Integra-Signum, which was subsequently adopted by the Swiss Federal Railways in 1933. In addition, many Swiss railway stations were (and continue to be) equipped with the company's signal boxes from the Domino 55, Domino 67, or Domino 69 series. Headquartered in Wallisellen, the company existed from the late 19th century until January 1, 1992, when it was acquired by Siemens. Siemens renamed the company to Siemens Integra Verkehrstechnik. It is now a division of Siemens Mobility.

References
 History of Siemens (Schweiz) AG (in German)
 History of the company's location in Wallisellen (in German)

Further reading
 Railway signaling company in India started by Integra Signum
 Examples of Domino 69 signal boxes developed by Integra Signum

Defunct companies of Switzerland
Railway companies of Switzerland